Susan Duerden (born 20 september, 1973) is a British actress and audiobook narrator. Her roles include the character of Carole Littleton in the television series Lost. She has performed on television, film, and theater.

Filmography

Film
Romance and Rejection (1997) – Woman in Pub
Clubhouse Detectives in Search of a Lost Princess (2002) – Marian
The First Vampire: Don't Fall for the Devil's Illusions  (2004) – Sister Ingrid
Supervolcano (2005) – Fiona Lieberman
Wannabe (2005) – Kate Hastings
Love Wrecked (2005) – Bree Taylor
A Midsummer Night's Rewrite (2006) – Kate / Tatiana
Unrest (2006) – Jasmin Blanchard- uncredited
Flushed Away (2006) – Mother
Luck of the Draw (2007) – Victoria
Like Magic (2007) – Jennifer
My Insignificant Other (2007) – Mel
Double Duty (2009) – Sophia 
Postman Pat: The Movie (2014) - Sara Clifton 
Ava's Impossible Things (2016)
Surface if Last Scattering (2016)
Branded (2017) - Kate
Forget About Nick (2017) - Jane

Television
 Verdict (1998) – Heather Smart
 Holby City (2000) – Amelia Ford
 Emmerdale (1999–2001) – Claudia Nash
 The Vice (2001) – Sarah
 The Bill (1997–2001) – Sally/Emily Speaks
 Attachments (2001) – Paula
 Doctors (2002) – Dr. Alison James
 Night and Day (2003) – Samantha
 The Unit (2008) – Lara Beerson
 Lost (2008–09) – Carole Littleton
 Zen (2011) – Evie
 Waterloo Road (2011) – Lilly Manson
Zen (2011) - Evie
NCIS (2015)- Lorraine Mallard 
Days Of Our Lives (2016) - recurring character Vicky Bush/Lauren De Cour 
Berlin Station (2019)

Video games
 Flushed Away (2006) – Rita
 The Last Remnant (2008) – Emma Honeywell
 Dragon Age: Origins (2009) – Additional voices
 Final Fantasy XIV (2010)
 Dragon Age II (2011) – Hadriana, Tarohne, Additional Voices

Accolades
Booklist's "Editors’ Choice: Media" for The Eyre Affair (2010) 
AudioFile's Best Voice in Fiction & Classics for The Tiger’s Wife (2011)
Booklist's "Editors’ Choice: Media" for The Tiger’s Wife (2011) 
Booklist's "Amazing Audiobooks for Young Adults" for Chime (2012)
Booklist's "Listen List" for The Tiger’s Wife (2012)
Audie Award nominations for Chime and Eloisa James' When Beauty Tamed the Beast (2012) 
YALSA "Amazing Audiobook" pick for Chime (2012) 
Group Audie Award nomination for "Distinguished Achievement in Production" for Bram Stoker's Dracula (2013)

References

External links
 

1973 births
Living people
Actresses from London
Audiobook narrators
English television actresses
English voice actresses